Wyoming Highway 76 (WYO 76) is a  long east–west Wyoming state highway in Carbon County that travels from Rawlins to Sinclair.

Route description
Highway 76 is the former routing of U.S. Routes 30 and 287 and still closely parallels their new route on Interstate 80. Highway 76 begins its west end at exit 215 of I-80 / US 30 / US 287 and the eastern terminus of I-80 Business / US 30 Business. Highway 76 heads east, running south of the interstate, but closely paralleling it until the town of Sinclair where I-80 / US 30 / US 287 pass over Highway 76 as it turns north and heads into town as S. 9th Street. At just over 4 miles, WYO 76 turns east on Lincoln Avenue (Exit 219 can be reached by heading west on Lincoln Avenue). Highway 76 continues east through the town of Sinclair as Lincoln Avenue, but now is on the north side of I-80. Shortly after leaving the town center, WYO 76 nears exit 221 of I-80/US 30/US 287 where it ends at 6.54 miles

Exit 215 of Interstate 80 does not mention Highway 76, but there are trailblazer signs along its routing.

History
In 1938, Highway 76 started out as the designation for Battle Mountain Road, which is the present-day routing of Highway 70 between Baggs and Riverside. At that time, the Highway 70 designation was applied to the current routing of Highway from Walcott Junction south into Saratoga, then south through Riverside into Colorado, then northeast into Laramie via Woods Landing.

Today's current routing of Highway 76 is the former alignment of US 30 / US 287 between I-80 (Exit 215) at Rawlins east to the East Sinclair interchange of I-80 (Exit 221).

Major intersections

References

 Official 2003 State Highway Map of Wyoming

External links

 Wyoming State Routes 000-099
 WYO 76 - I-80/US 30/US 287 to I-80/I-80 Bus/US 30/US 287/US 30 Bus
 City of Rawlins website
 Carbon County-Town of Sinclair website

Transportation in Carbon County, Wyoming
076
U.S. Route 30
U.S. Route 287
Rawlins, Wyoming